Dating is an activity by two humans who are exploring or are in a romantic relationship. 

The term may also refer to:
 Courtship, period in a couple's relationship which precedes engagement and marriage
 Timestamp, information identifying the date and time when a certain event occurred

Chronological dating, estimating the age of an object or linguistic artifact
Relative dating, determining the relative order of past events
Absolute dating, determining an approximate age in archaeology or geology
Radiometric dating, a family of techniques used to date objects using radioactive impurities
Dendrochronology, dating tree rings to the year they were formed

See also
Blind date (disambiguation)